Abū al-Khayr Muḥammad Ayyūb ʿAlī al-Māturīdī (1919–1995), or simply Ayub Ali, was a Bangladeshi Islamic scholar, author and educationist. He was awarded the Ekushey Padak in 1976 by the Government of Bangladesh.

Early life and education
Ali was born in 1919, to a Bengali Muslim family in the village of Telikhali in Firozpur, Backergunge District, Bengal Presidency. His father, Abdul Wahed, was a moulvi, and his mother, Abida Khatun, was a housewife.

Education
Ali studied at the Calcutta Alia Madrasa, receiving his alim certification in 1933, fazil in 1936 and kamil in 1938. He then enrolled at the University of Dhaka where he earned his BA Honors and MA degrees in Islamic Studies in 1943 and 1944 respectively. Ali received the Raja Kalinarayan Scholarship (one of the most prestigious scholarships at the university). He obtained a second MA degree in Persian from the same university in 1950. He then studied at the Al-Azhar University in Cairo, Egypt where he received his Alimiyyah Diploma in 1953 and Ph.D. in 1955.

Career
Ali joined Dhaka College as a lecturer in 1944. He then served as the principal of the Rajshahi Madrasa between 1958 and 1969, the Sylhet Government Alia Madrasah between 1970 and 1973, and then at Government Madrasah-e-Alia, Dhaka from 1973 to 1979. He has written several books in English, Bengali and Arabic. In 1976, he was awarded the Ekushey Padak by the Government of Bangladesh for his literary contributions.

Death
Ali died in 1995.

Works
History of Traditional Islamic education in Bangladesh (in English)
 ʿAqīdah al-Islām wa al-Imām al-Māturīdī (1983)

Notes

References 

1919 births
1995 deaths
University of Dhaka alumni
Al-Azhar University alumni
Academic staff of Sylhet Government Alia Madrasah
Recipients of the Ekushey Padak
Academic staff of Dhaka College
People from Pirojpur District
English-language writers from Bangladesh
Bangladeshi Arabic writers
Bangladeshi Sunni Muslim scholars of Islam
Maturidis